Saint-Ellier-du-Maine (literally Saint-Ellier of the Maine) is a commune in the Mayenne department in north-western France.

The commune is part of the historical province of Maine.

See also
Communes of Mayenne

References

Saintellierdumaine